Rogojeni is a commune in Șoldănești District, Moldova. It is composed of two villages, Rogojeni and Rogojeni station.

References

Communes of Șoldănești District